California Men's Colony (CMC) is a male-only state prison located northwest of the city of San Luis Obispo, San Luis Obispo County, California, along the central California coast approximately halfway between Los Angeles and San Francisco.

Facilities
CMC has two physically separate facilities on its : East and West. The minimum-security West facility includes Level I ("without a secure perimeter") housing and Level II ("with secure perimeter fences and armed coverage") open dormitories.  The medium-security east facility has level III with individual cells, fenced perimeters and armed coverage, with housing divided into four quadrangles, as well as a licensed hospital and mental health delivery system.

As of Fiscal Year 2006/2007, CMC had a total of 1,870 staff and an annual operating budget of $151 million. As of March 2012, the facility's total population was 5,524, or more than 143.9 percent of its design capacity of 3,838.

As of April 30, 2020, CMC was incarcerating people at 97.1% of its design capacity, with 3,727 occupants.

Programs
CMC has been called a "country club" and "garden spot" among California prisons because of its wide variety of vocational, educational and psychological-treatment programs. Notable CMC programs include:

 Arts in Corrections, "designed to rehabilitate inmates through art."  
 A "Level I camp program for fire suppression, conservation and other community service work." The jobs include "trash pickup and removal" at Port San Luis Harbor District properties, including Avila Beach.
 Central Coast Adult School, which "aims to reduce the recidivism rate and help inmates rejoin the work force."
 Prison Industry Authority, which "manufactures and ships millions of dollars of prison-made products annually."
 Prisoners Against Child Abuse, which "donates more than $100,000 a year to local children's organizations."
 Narcotics Anonymous.
 Alcoholics Anonymous.

History
The West Facility opened in 1954 and the East Facility opened in 1961. Three female former CMC workers won a 1998 settlement for $4.3 million as a result of a sexual harassment lawsuit, which was "the largest such settlement ever for the Department of Corrections." A San Luis Obispo County grand jury produced a 2005 report observing that "while old and overcrowded, CMC was well maintained." The West facility is slated for closure.

Notable inmates
 Bobby Beausoleil, convicted murderer associated with the Manson Family (though convicted of a crime pre-dating the Tate/LaBianca murders), was incarcerated at CMC during the 1990s. His wife, Barbara, lived nearby for years.
 Lawrence Bittaker and Roy Norris met at CMC in 1978, before they committed their crime spree.
 In 1996, Christian Brando was released from CMC "after serving five years of a 10-year term in the fatal shooting of his half sister's boyfriend."
 Bruce McGregor Davis, convicted Manson Family murderer serving two life sentences for his parts in two Manson Family murders.  Parole has been recommended pending governor's review.
 Richard Allen Davis was paroled from CMC in June 1993 "after serving half of a 16-year sentence" for kidnapping.
Rapper Tracy Lamar Davis (a.k.a. Big Tray Deee) was convicted for attempted murder in 2005 for firing at rival gang members. He was sentenced to twelve years in prison but was released after nine years on April 3, 2014.
 Jim Gordon, the drummer, spent some time at CMC after killing his mother in 1983. As of 2005, however, he was in Atascadero State Hospital.
 Thomas "Hollywood" Henderson was in CMC between 1984 and October 1986 "for sexually assaulting two teen-age girls and then trying to bribe them not to testify against him."
 Larry Hurwitz. The "Starry Night" murder dominated the headlines in Portland in the 1990s.
 Maulana Karenga was incarcerated in 1971 after being convicted of felony violence against a woman victim who testified he tortured her. 
 Charles Keating Jr. began his stay at CMC in 1992, but his state and federal convictions were overturned, so he was released in October 1996.
 Suge Knight was incarcerated at CMC beginning in February 1997 but was later transferred to Mule Creek State Prison.
 Timothy Leary was imprisoned at CMC after being sentenced in March 1970 for possession of marijuana, but escaped from the West facility in September 1970 with the assistance of the Weatherman organization.  He had been placed in "the least security-rated institution in the state" because "he did not 'represent either violence potential or serious escape risk'." After spending time with Eldridge Cleaver in Algeria and attempting to "gain political asylum" in Switzerland, Leary was arrested in Afghanistan in January 1973.  After being convicted of "escape from a minimum security prison," he was sent to California Medical Facility.
 Demetrius "Hook" Mitchell was at CMC between 2000 and 2004.  Much of the film documentary Hooked: The Legend of Demetrius "Hook" Mitchell was filmed while Hook was at CMC.  Since being released from CMC Hook has started Project Straight Path, a non-profit organization committed to raise the consciousness of youths, desire of youth's interest in education and raise cultural consciousness.
 Herbert Mullin "spent nearly 20 years" at CMC "before being transferred to Mule Creek in 1993."
Prominent Black Panther leader Huey P. Newton was at CMC between 1968 and 1970. He was confined to his cell because he refused to work.
 Craig Peyer - Former CHP officer convicted of murdering Cara Knott while on duty.  His next parole hearing will be in 2027.
 Mark Rogowski - Former professional skateboarder pleaded guilty on March 20, 1991 to the murder (first-degree) and rape of Jessica Bergsten. Denied parole on March 9, 2016. He will not be eligible for parole for 7 years until March 2023 but may petition to advance his next parole suitability hearing date.
 Lawrence Singleton in 1987 "earned an early release [from CMC] through a work program and good behavior" after having served 8 years of a 14-year sentence.
 Edgar Smith, now at High Desert State Prison (California), had a parole hearing in March 2007.
 Ike Turner served 18 months of a four-year sentence at CMC between March 1990 and September 1991 for cocaine possession offenses.
 Charles "Tex" Watson was at CMC between the early 1970s and 1993, where he "married and fathered three children during conjugal visits" and "began operating a nonprofit Christian ministry that distributed audio tapes and solicited donations." He was then transferred to the medium-security Mule Creek State Prison.  A spokesman for the prison stated that the move was "part of the routine shuffling of inmates around the state"; however, others said that it was related to pressure from the family of Sharon Tate, recommendations of the state Board of Prison Terms, and the actions of a state senator.
 Jean-Pierre Michael Wehry was arrested in the 2006 Riverside, California To Catch a Predator sting. He received the longest sentence in To Catch a Predator history (75 years to life) due to California's three-strikes law and remains incarcerated to this day. He released an autobiography titled In For Life: Confessions of a Three-Strikes Prisoner under the pen name Damien Lartigue.
 Richard Allen Minsky convicted serial rapist.

References

External links

 California Men's Colony - California Department of Corrections
 Center for Land Use Interpretation. California Men's Colony. Entry in Land Use Database of "unusual and exemplary sites throughout the United States."

1954 establishments in California
Prisons in California
Buildings and structures in San Luis Obispo County, California
Buildings and structures in San Luis Obispo, California
Men's prisons
Men in the United States